Vladimir Suchánek (12 February 1933 – 25 January 2021) was a Czech graphic artist and postage stamp designer.

Early life and career
Suchánek was born on 12 February 1933 in Nové Město nad Metují. He studied at Charles University in Prague (1952–54) but dropped out, under Professors Bouda, Lidický and Salcman, and at the Academy of Fine Arts in Prague (1954–60), where he specialized in graphic arts under Professor Silovský. He specialised in graphic arts, painting, book illustrations, stamp designs and bookplates.

He graduated from the Pedagogical University in 1954 and The Academy of Art in Prague in 1961. His work has been exhibited in many major collections.

The former musician played in the sixties together with other stamp designers in a band named Grafičanka.

He was President of the Hollar Society, the leading Czech graphic art organisation.

Stamp designer
He was the designer of several stamps for the Czech Republic, but he also was the designer of the stamp for the 1000th anniversary of the death of St. Adalbert in 1997. This stamp was released in the Czech Republic, Hungary, Germany, Poland and the Vatican.

Suchánek was a member of HOLLAR, the Association of Czech Graphic Artists. Since 1995, he served as President of the Association. In 1997, he was appointed a member of the European Academy of Sciences and Arts, based in Vienna. In 2006 he was awarded a state decoration – a Medal for service to art.

Suchánek came from a generation that played a crucial positive role in the development of Czech art in the second half of the 20th century. Suchánek's graphic prints reveal not only a rich imagination and characterful poetry, but also a masterful command of colour lithography, which is his graphic technique of choice. He has achieved widespread international recognition in this field, collecting 27 top awards for his work.

Shows
By 2008 he had held 146 one-man shows in the Czech Republic and abroad – in the Netherlands, Belgium, Germany, Japan, the US, Sweden, Denmark, Poland and Slovakia. He has taken part in almost 300 exhibitions, including international biennials of graphic art – Ljubljana, Kraków, Paris, Trieste, Grenchen, Buenos Aires, Frechen, Bradford, Biella, Rijeka, Segovia, Tokyo, Heidelberg, Nuremberg, Malbork, Lodz, Frederikshavn,
Berlin, Miami, Toronto, Fredrikstad and Beijing.

Since the 1970s his colour lithographs have been exhibited in European galleries presenting modern Czech graphic art.

Bookplates
In the field of bookplates, Suchánek was a contemporary artist who created more than 300 bookplates for collectors from across the world. In the Czech Republic, he was also known for his book illustrations and postage stamp designs. His work is represented in the collections of the National Gallery in Prague, the Albertina in Vienna, the Rockford Art Museum and in many other public and private collections in the Czech Republic and abroad.

References

1933 births
2021 deaths
Czech stamp designers
Czech graphic designers
Recipients of Medal of Merit (Czech Republic)
Members of the European Academy of Sciences and Arts
People from Nové Město nad Metují
Charles University alumni